The following is a partial list of geographic features on Baranof Island:

Lakes
Baranof Lake
Blue Lake
Camp Lake
Green Lake
Indigo Lake
Medvejie Lake
Redoubt Lake
Swan Lake

Mountains
Peak 5390
Mount Bassie
Mount Furuhelm
Mount Verstovia

Rivers
 Baranof River
 Indian River

Baranof Island